Eduardo Gonçalves de Andrade (born 25 January 1947), generally known as Tostão, is a Brazilian former professional footballer who played as a forward or attacking midfielder.

Tostão was an intelligent, hardworking and prolific left-footed forward, who was known for his creativity and technical skills, and was considered one of the best players in the world in his prime. He played most of his 11-year career with Cruzeiro.

Tostão represented Brazil in two World Cups, winning the tournament in 1970. He formed a lethal offensive partnership with Pelé in the national team.

Football career 
Born in Belo Horizonte, Minas Gerais, Eduardo Andrade received, like the vast majority of Brazilian footballers, a nickname early into his football career, being dubbed 'Tostão' (little coin). Legend has it that as a six-year-old school boy he netted 47 goals in one game for his primary school football team.

Tostão made his professional debut aged only 15, for local América Mineiro, returning after two years to Cruzeiro, where he had started his youth career. Although being a centre midfielder, he was crowned the Campeonato Mineiro's topscorer on three consecutive occasions, the first in 1966, and left the club as its all-time scorer, with a total of 249 goals.

In the 1970 FIFA World Cup, improvised as a forward, Tostão scored two of his 32 goals for Brazil, and assisted four, as the national team won its third trophy, whilst finding the net on 19 occasions. The previous year, after being hit in the face by a ball during a match against Corinthians, he suffered a detached retina from which he never fully recovered. In April 1972, he signed for Vasco da Gama for a then record fee in the country but, after good overall displays, was forced to retire from the game at only 27, after his sight problems resurfaced, despite attempts at corrective surgery.

Weary of football and fame, Tostão became a medical doctor, but ultimately rejoined the footballing world, working as a journalist and pundit on TV.

Style of play 
Tostão was, due to his relatively small stature and slender frame, not particularly skilled in the air; in spite of his lack of pace, strong physical attributes, or long-range shooting abilities, however, he was a mobile, intelligent, and hard-working footballer, who stood out throughout his career due to his anticipation and timing in the penalty area, which made him a prolific goalscorer. A predominantly left-footed player, in his prime, he was considered one of the best players in the world, and was known for his technique, balance, and dribbling skills, while also contributing with many assists thanks to his vision, creativity, precise passing and playmaking abilities, as well as his work-rate, which often saw him drop back into midfield in order to retrieve the ball and start attacking plays. He was also known for his ability to disorient defenders and get onto the end of passes or create space for teammates with his movement and runs off the ball, which saw him act in a role which was essentially functioning as a precursor of the modern false 9 role with Brazil during the 1970 World Cup, despite being deployed as a centre-forward on paper. Due to his versatility and wide range of skills, he was capable of playing in several attacking and midfield positions including as an attacking midfielder, as a second striker, as a left winger, or even as an out-and-out striker.

Career statistics

International goals

Honours

Club 
Cruzeiro
 Campeonato Brasileiro Série A: 1966
 Campeonato Mineiro: 1965, 1966, 1967, 1968, 1969

International 
Brazil
FIFA World Cup: 1970

Individual 
 Bola de Prata: 1970
 Campeonato Brasileiro Série A Top Scorer: 1970 (12 goals)
 South American Footballer of the Year: 1971
 IFFHS Brazilian Player of the 20th Century (5th place)
 IFFHS South American Player of the 20th Century (13th place)
 World Soccer: The 100 Greatest Footballers of All Time
 Brazilian Football Museum Hall of Fame

References

External links 
 
 International appearances; at RSSSF
 Legendary Football Players - Tostão

1947 births
Living people
Footballers from Belo Horizonte
Brazilian footballers
Association football midfielders
Association football forwards
América Futebol Clube (MG) players
Cruzeiro Esporte Clube players
CR Vasco da Gama players
Campeonato Brasileiro Série A players
Brazil international footballers
1966 FIFA World Cup players
1970 FIFA World Cup players
FIFA World Cup-winning players
South American Footballer of the Year winners
20th-century Brazilian physicians
Brazilian columnists